Chittagong (/ˈtʃɪt əˌɡɒŋ/ chit-uh-gong; officially Chattogram), is the second-largest city in Bangladesh after Dhaka and third largest city in Bengal region. It is the administrative seat of the eponymous division and district. It hosts the busiest seaport on the Bay of Bengal. The city is located on the banks of the Karnaphuli River between the Chittagong Hill Tracts and the Bay of Bengal. The Greater Chittagong Area had a population of more than 5.2 million in 2022. In 2020, the city area had a population of more than 3.9 million.

One of the world's oldest ports with a functional natural harbor for centuries,  Chittagong appeared on ancient Greek and Roman maps, including on Ptolemy's world map. It was located on the southern branch of the Silk Road. In the 9th century, merchants from the Abbasid Caliphate established a trading post in Chittagong. The port fell to the Muslim conquest of Bengal during the 14th century. It was the site of a royal mint under the Delhi Sultanate, Bengal Sultanate and Mughal Empire. Between the 15th and 17th centuries, Chittagong was also a center of administrative, literary, commercial and maritime activities in Arakan, a narrow strip of land along the eastern coast of the Bay of Bengal which was under strong Bengali influence for 350 years. During the 16th century, the port became a Portuguese trading post and João de Barros described it as "the most famous and wealthy city of the Kingdom of Bengal". The Mughal Empire expelled the Portuguese and Arakanese in 1666. Like the rest of Bengal British East India Company took control of the city in 1793. The Port of Chittagong was re-organized in 1887 and its busiest shipping links were with British Burma. In 1928, Chittagong was declared a "Major Port" of British India. During World War II, Chittagong was a base for Allied Forces engaged in the Burma Campaign. The port city began to expand and industrialize during the 1940s, particularly after the Partition of British India. The city was the historic terminus of the Assam Bengal Railway and Pakistan Eastern Railway. During the Bangladesh Liberation War in 1971, Chittagong was the site of the Bangladeshi declaration of independence. The port city has benefited from the growth of heavy industry, logistics, and manufacturing in Bangladesh. Trade unionism was strong during the 1990s.

Chittagong accounts for 12% of Bangladesh's GDP, including 40% of industrial output, 80% of international trade, and 50% of tax revenue. The port city is home to many of the oldest and largest companies in the country. The Port of Chittagong is one of the busiest ports in South Asia. The largest base of the Bangladesh Navy is located in Chittagong, along with an air base of the Bangladesh Air Force, garrisons of the Bangladesh Army and the main base of the Bangladesh Coast Guard. The eastern zone of the Bangladesh Railway is based in Chittagong. The Chittagong Stock Exchange is one of the twin stock markets of Bangladesh with over 700 listed companies. The Chittagong Tea Auction is a commodity exchange dealing with Bangladeshi tea. The CEPZ and KEPZ are key industrial zones with foreign direct investments. The city is served by Shah Amanat International Airport for domestic and external flights. Chittagong has a high degree of religious and ethnic diversity among Bangladeshi cities, despite having a great Bengali Muslim majority. Minorities include Bengali Hindus, Bengali Christians, Bengali Buddhists, Chakmas, Marmas, Tripuris, Garos and others.

Etymology

The etymology of Chittagong is uncertain. One explanation credits the first Arab traders for shatt ghangh where shatt means "delta" and ghangh stood for the Ganges. The Arakanese chronicle that a king named Tsu-la-taing Tsandaya (Sula Taing Chandra), after conquering Bengal, set up a stone pillar as a trophy/memorial at the place since called Tst-ta-gaung as the limit of conquest. This Arakanese king ascended the throne in Arakan year 311 ME, corresponding to 952 A.D. He conquered this place two years later. This stone pillar with the inscription Tset-ta-gaung, meaning 'to make war is improper, cannot be a myth. However, the local name of the city (in Bengali or Chittagonian) Chatga, which is a corruption of Chatgao or Chatigao, and officially Chottogram bears the meaning of "village or town of Chatta (possibly a caste or tribe)." Therefore, Bengali name Chattagrama, the Chinese Tsa-ti-kiang, Cheh-ti.gan and the European Chittagong are but the deformed versions of the Arakanese name Tset-ta-gaung.

The port city has been known by various names in history, including Chatigaon, Chatigam, Chattagrama, Islamabad, Chattala, Chaityabhumi and Porto Grande De Bengala.

Name
The Bengali word for Chittagong, Chottogram (চট্টগ্রাম), has the suffix "-gram" (গ্রাম) meaning village in Standard Bengali. A legend dates the name to the spread of Islam, when a Muslim lit a chati (lamp) at the top of a hill in the city and called out Azaan for people. The city was renamed Islamabad (City of Islam) and continues to be used in the old city during the Mughal era. In April 2018, the Cabinet Division of the Bangladesh Government decided to change the city's name to Chattogram, based on its Bengali spelling and pronunciation.

Chittagong used to be a small fishing village of Manikya King. 
"Chati" means "Lamp" and "Gam" means "Good".
Portuguese arrived here for business purpose and they asked some land from King of Tripura. And King of Tripura granted some lands to Portuguese for business purposes.

Chittagong is popularly known as Baro Auliyar Desh (Land of twelve Sufi saints).

History

Stone Age fossils and tools unearthed in the region indicate that Chittagong has been inhabited since Neolithic times. It is an ancient port city, with a recorded history dating back to the 4th century BC. Its harbour was mentioned in Ptolemy's world map in the 2nd century as one of the most impressive ports in the East. The region was part of the ancient Bengali Samatata and Harikela kingdoms. The Chandra dynasty once dominated the area, and was followed by the Varman dynasty and Deva dynasty.

Chinese traveler Xuanzang described the area as "a sleeping beauty rising from mist and water" in the 7th century.

Arab Muslim traders frequented Chittagong from the 9th century. In 1154, Al-Idrisi wrote of a busy shipping route between Basra and Chittagong, connecting it with the Abbasid capital of Baghdad.

Many Sufi missionaries settled in Chittagong and played an instrumental role in the spread of Islam.

Sultan Fakhruddin Mubarak Shah of Sonargaon conquered Chittagong in 1340, making it a part of Sultanate of Bengal. It was the principal maritime gateway to the kingdom, which was reputed as one of the wealthiest states in the Indian subcontinent. Medieval Chittagong was a hub for maritime trade with China, Sumatra, the Maldives, Sri Lanka, the Middle East, and East Africa. It was notable for its medieval trades in pearls, silk, muslin, rice, bullion, horses, and gunpowder. The port was also a major shipbuilding hub.

Ibn Battuta visited the port city in 1345. Niccolò de' Conti, from Venice, also visited around the same time as Battuta. Chinese admiral Zheng He's treasure fleet anchored in Chittagong during imperial missions to the Sultanate of Bengal.

Dhaniya Manikya conquered Chittagong in 1513, Hossain Shah sent his noble commander Gorai Mallik to attack Tripura. Gorai Mallik recaptured the territories lost. But the next year in 1514 Dhaniya Manikya again conquered Chittagong.

Chittagong featured prominently in the military history of the Bengal Sultanate, including during the Reconquest of Arakan and the Bengal Sultanate–Kingdom of Mrauk U War of 1512–1516.

During the 13th and 16th centuries, Arabs and Persians heavily colonized the port city of Chittagong, initially arriving for trade and to spread Islam. Most Arab settlers arrived from the trade route between Iraq and Chittagong, and were perhaps the prime reason for the spread of Islam to Bangladesh. The first Persian settlers also arrived for trade and religious purposes, with the possible goal of Persianisation as well. Persians and other Iranic peoples have deeply affected the history of the Bengal Sultanate, with Persian being one of the main languages of the Muslim state, as well as also influencing the Chittagonian language and writing scripts. It has been affirmed that much of the Muslim population in Chittagong are descendants of the Arab and Persian settlers.

Two decades after Vasco Da Gama's landing in Calicut, the Bengal Sultanate permitted the Portuguese settlement in Chittagong to be established in 1528. It became the first European colonial enclave in Bengal. The Bengal Sultanate lost control of Chittagong in 1531 after Arakan declared independence and the established Kingdom of Mrauk U. This altered geopolitical landscape allowed the Portuguese unhindered control of Chittagong for over a century.

Portuguese ships from Goa and Malacca began frequenting the port city in the 16th century. The cartaz system was introduced and required all ships in the area to purchase naval trading licenses from the Portuguese settlement. Slave trade and piracy flourished. The nearby island of Sandwip was conquered in 1602. In 1615, the Portuguese Navy defeated a joint Dutch East India Company and Arakanese fleet near the coast of Chittagong.

In 1666, the Mughal government of Bengal led by viceroy Shaista Khan moved to retake Chittagong from Portuguese and Arakanese control. They launched the Mughal conquest of Chittagong. The Mughals attacked the Arakanese from the jungle with a 6,500-strong army, which was further supported by 288 Mughal naval ships blockading the Chittagong harbor. After three days of battle, the Arakanese surrendered. The Mughals expelled the Portuguese from Chittagong. Mughal rule ushered a new era in the history of Chittagong territory to the southern bank of Kashyapnadi (Kaladan river). The port city was renamed Islamabad. The Grand Trunk Road connected it with North India and Central Asia. Economic growth increased due to an efficient system of land grants for clearing hinterlands for cultivation. The Mughals also contributed to the architecture of the area, including the building of Fort Ander and many mosques. Chittagong was integrated into the prosperous greater Bengali economy, which also included Orissa and Bihar. Shipbuilding increased dramatically under the Mughal rule, and the Ottoman Sultans had many Ottoman warships built in Chittagong during this period.

In 1685, the British East India Company sent out an expedition under Admiral Nicholson with the instructions to seize and fortify Chittagong on behalf of the English; however, the expedition proved abortive. Two years later, the company's Court of Directors decided to make Chittagong the headquarters of their Bengal trade and sent out a fleet of ten or eleven ships to seize it under Captain Heath. However, after reaching Chittagong in early 1689, the fleet found the city too strongly held and abandoned their attempt at capturing it. The city was possessed by the Nawab of Bengal until 1793 when East India Company took complete control of the former Mughal province of Bengal.

The First Anglo-Burmese War in 1823 threatened the British hold on Chittagong. There were several rebellions against British rule, notably during the Indian rebellion of 1857, when the 2nd, 3rd, and 4th companies of the 34th Bengal Infantry Regiment revolted and released all prisoners from the city's jail. In a backlash, the rebels were suppressed by the Sylhet Light Infantry.

Railways were introduced in 1865, beginning with the Eastern Bengal Railway connecting Chittagong to Dacca and Calcutta. The Assam Bengal Railway connected the port city to its interior economic hinterland, which included the world's largest tea and jute producing regions, as well as one of the world's earliest petroleum industries. Chittagong was a major center of trade with British Burma. It hosted many prominent companies of the British Empire, including James Finlay, Duncan Brothers, Burmah Oil, the Indo-Burma Petroleum Company, Lloyd's, Mckenzie and Mckenzie, the Chartered Bank of India, Australia and China, Turner Morrison, James Warren, the Raleigh Brothers, Lever Brothers, and the Shell Oil Company.

The Chittagong armoury raid by Bengali revolutionaries in 1930 was a major event in British India's anti-colonial history.

During World War II, Chittagong became a frontline city in the Southeast Asian Theater. It was a critical air, naval and military base for Allied Forces during the Burma Campaign against Japan. The Imperial Japanese Army Air Force carried out air raids on Chittagong in April and May 1942, in the run-up to the aborted Japanese invasion of Bengal. British forces were forced to temporarily withdraw to Comilla and the city was evacuated. After the Battle of Imphal, the tide turned in favor of the Allied Forces. Units of the United States Army Air Forces' 4th Combat Cargo Group were stationed in Chittagong Airfield in 1945. Commonwealth forces included troops from Britain, India, Australia, and New Zealand. The war had major negative impacts on the city, including the growth of refugees and the Great Famine of 1943.

Many wealthy Chittagonians profited from wartime commerce. The Partition of British India in 1947 made Chittagong the chief port of East Pakistan. In the 1950s, Chittagong witnessed increased industrial development. Among pioneering industrial establishments included those of Chittagong Jute Mills, the Burmah Eastern Refinery, the Karnaphuli Paper Mills, and Pakistan National Oil. However, East Pakistanis complained of a lack of investment in Chittagong in comparison to Karachi in West Pakistan, even though East Pakistan generated more exports and had a larger population. The Awami League demanded that the country's naval headquarters be shifted from Karachi to Chittagong.

During the Bangladesh Liberation War in 1971, which was waged under the leadership of Sheikh Mujibur Rahman, Chittagong witnessed heavy fighting between rebel Bengali military regiments and the Pakistan Army. It covered Sector 1 in the Mukti Bahini chain of command. Major Ziaur Rahman was the sector commander. The Bangladeshi Declaration of Independence was broadcast from Kalurghat Radio Station and transmitted internationally through foreign ships in Chittagong Port. Ziaur Rahman and M A Hannan announced the independence declaration from Chittagong. It began the journey of Swadhin Bangla Betar Kendra which contributed heavily towards the Liberation. The Pakistani military, and supporting Razakar militias, carried out widespread atrocities against civilians in the city. Mukti Bahini naval commandos drowned several Pakistani warships during Operation Jackpot in August 1971. In December 1971, the Bangladesh Air Force and the Indian Air Force carried out the heavy bombing of facilities occupied by the Pakistani military. A naval blockade was also enforced.

After the war, the Soviet Navy was tasked with clearing mines in Chittagong Port and restoring its operational capability. 22 vessels of the Soviet Pacific Fleet sailed from Vladivostok to Chittagong in May 1972. The process of clearing mines in the dense water harbor took nearly a year and claimed the life of one Soviet marine. Chittagong soon regained its status as a major port, with cargo tonnage surpassing pre-war levels in 1973. In free market reforms launched by President Ziaur Rahman in the late 1970s, the city became home to the first export processing zones in Bangladesh. Zia was assassinated during an attempted military coup in Chittagong in 1981. The 1991 Bangladesh cyclone inflicted heavy damage on the city. The Japanese government financed the construction of several heavy industries and an international airport in the 1980s and 90s. Bangladeshi private sector investments increased since 1991, especially with the formation of the Chittagong Stock Exchange in 1995. The port city has been the pivot of Bangladesh's emerging economy in recent years, with the country's rising GDP growth rate.

Geography

Topography

It straddles the coastal foothills of the Chittagong Hill Tracts in southeastern Bangladesh. The Karnaphuli River runs along the southern banks of the city, including its central business district. Chittagong has many lakes that were created under the Mughal rule. In 1924, an engineering team of the Assam Bengal Railway established the Foy's Lake.

Major sediment outflows from the Ganges and Brahmaputra rivers form tidal flats around the city.

Ecological hinterland
The Chittagong Division is known for its rich biodiversity. Over 2000 of Bangladesh's 6000 flowering plants grow in the region. Its hills and jungles are laden with waterfalls, fast flowing river streams and elephant reserves. St. Martin's Island, within the Chittagong Division, is the only coral island in the country. The fishing port of Cox's Bazar is home to one of the world's longest natural beaches. In the east, there are the three hill districts of Bandarban, Rangamati, and Khagrachari, home to the highest mountains in Bangladesh. The region has numerous protected areas, including the Teknaf Game Reserve and the Sitakunda Botanical Garden and Eco Park.

Climate
Under the Köppen climate classification, Chittagong has a tropical monsoon climate (Am).

Chittagong is vulnerable to North Indian Ocean tropical cyclones. The deadliest tropical cyclone to strike Chittagong was the 1991 Bangladesh cyclone, which killed 138,000 people and left as many as 10 million homeless.

Government

The Chittagong City Corporation (CCC) is responsible for governing municipal areas in the Chittagong Metropolitan Area. It is headed by the Mayor of Chittagong. The mayor and ward councilors are elected every five years. The mayor is Awami League leader A. J. M. Nasiuruddin, as of May 2015. The city corporation's mandate is limited to basic civic services, however, the CCC is credited for keeping Chittagong one of the cleaner and most eco-friendly cities in Bangladesh. Its principal sources of revenue are municipal taxes and conservancy charges. The Chittagong Development Authority is responsible for implementing the city's urban planning.

The Deputy Commissioner and District Magistrate are the chiefs of local administration as part of the Government of Bangladesh. Law enforcement is provided by the Chittagong Metropolitan Police and the Rapid Action Battalion-7. The District and Sessions Judge is the head of the local judiciary on behalf of the Supreme Court of Bangladesh. The Divisional Special Judge's Court is located in the colonial-era Chittagong Court Building.

Military

Chittagong is a strategically important military port on the Bay of Bengal. The Chittagong Naval Area is the principal base of the Bangladesh Navy and the home port of most Bangladeshi warships. The Bangladesh Naval Academy and the navy's elite special force- Special Warfare Diving and Salvage (SWADS) are also based in the city. The Bangladesh Army's 24th Infantry Division is based in Chittagong Cantonment, and the Bangladesh Air Force maintains the BAF Zahurul Haq Air Base in Chittagong. The city is also home to the Bangladesh Military Academy, the premier training institute for the country's armed forces.

Diplomatic representation
In the 1860s, the American Consulate-General in the Bengal Presidency included a consular agency in Chittagong. Today, Chittagong hosts an assistant high commission of India and a consulate general of Russia. The city also has honorary consulates of Turkey, Japan, Germany, South Korea, Malaysia, Italy, and the Philippines.

Economy

A substantial share of Bangladesh's national GDP is attributed to Chittagong. The port city contributes 12% of the nation's economy. Chittagong generates for 40% of Bangladesh's industrial output, 80% of its international trade and 50% of its governmental revenue. The Chittagong Stock Exchange has more than 700 listed companies, with a market capitalisation of US$32 billion in June 2015. The city is home to many of the country's oldest and largest corporations. The Port of Chittagong handled US$60 billion in annual trade in 2011, ranking 3rd in South Asia after the Port of Mumbai and the Port of Colombo. The port is part of the Maritime Silk Road that runs from the Chinese coast via the Suez Canal to the Mediterranean and on to the Upper Adriatic region of Trieste with rail connections to Central and Eastern Europe.

The Agrabad area is the main central business district of the city. Major Bangladeshi conglomerates headquartered in Chittagong include M. M. Ispahani Limited, BSRM, A K Khan & Company, PHP Group, James Finlay Bangladesh, the Habib Group, the S. Alam Group of Industries, Seamark Group, KDS Group and the T. K. Group of Industries. Major state-owned firms headquartered there include Pragati Industries, the Jamuna Oil Company, the Bangladesh Shipping Corporation and the Padma Oil Company. The Chittagong Export Processing Zone was ranked by the UK-based magazine, Foreign Direct Investment, as one of the leading special economic zones in the world, in 2010. Other SEZs include the Karnaphuli Export Processing Zone and Korean EPZ. The city's key industrial sectors include petroleum, steel, shipbuilding, chemicals, pharmaceuticals, textiles, jute, leather goods, vegetable oil refineries, glass manufacturing, electronics and motor vehicles. The Chittagong Tea Auction sets the price of Bangladesh Tea. The Eastern Refinery is Bangladesh's largest oil refinery. GlaxoSmithKline has had operations in Chittagong since 1967. Western Marine Shipyard is a leading Bangladeshi shipbuilder and exporter of medium-sized ocean-going vessels. In 2011–12, Chittagong exported approximately US$4.5 billion in ready-made garments. The Karnaphuli Paper Mills were established in 1953. 

International banks operating in Chittagong include HSBC, Standard Chartered and Citibank NA.
Chittagong is often called Bangladesh's commercial capital due to its diversified industrial base and seaport. The port city has ambitions to develop as a global financial center and regional transshipment hub, given its proximity to North East India, Burma, Nepal, Bhutan and Southwest China.

CBDs
Agrabad
O R Nizam Road
Strand Road, Chittagong
Khatungonj
Asadgonj

Financial and commodity markets
Chittagong Stock Exchange
Chittagong Tea Auction

Trade associations
Chittagong Chamber of Commerce & Industry

Industrial areas
Chittagong Export Processing Zone
Karnaphuli Export Processing Zone
Mirasorai Export processing zone
Korean export processing zome
China Economic Zone
Matarbari Economic zone

Culture

An inhabitant of Chittagong is called Chittagonian in English. For centuries, the port city has been a melting pot for people from all over the world. Its historic trade networks have left a lasting impact on its language, culture, and cuisine. The Chittagonian language has many Arabic, Persian, English and Portuguese loanwords. The popular traditional feast of Mezban features the serving of hot beef dish with white rice. Another dish named kala-bhuna of Chittagong, which is made with traditional spices, mustard oil, and beef through a special cooking style, is also renowned all over Bangladesh. The cultivation of pink pearls is a historic activity in Chittagong. Its Mughal-era name, Islamabad (City of Islam), continues to be used in the old city. The name was given due to the port city's history as a gateway for early Islamic missionaries in Bengal. Notable Islamic architecture in Chittagong can be seen in the historic Bengal Sultanate-era Hammadyar Mosque and the Mughal fort of Anderkilla. Chittagong is known as the Land of the Twelve Saints due to the prevalence of major Sufi Muslim shrines in the district. Historically, Sufism played an important role in the spread of Islam in the region. Prominent dargahs include the mausoleum of Shah Amanat and the shrine of Bayazid Bastami. The Bastami shrine hosts a pond of black softshell turtles.
During the medieval period, many poets thrived in the region when it was part of the Bengal Sultanate and the Kingdom of Mrauk U. Under the patronage of Sultan Alauddin Husain Shah's governor in Chittagong, Kabindra Parameshvar wrote his Pandabbijay, a Bengali adaptation of the Mahabharata. Daulat Qazi lived in the region during the 17th-century reign of the Kingdom of Mrauk U. Chittagong is home to several important Hindu temples, including the Chandranath Temple on the outskirts of the city, which is dedicated to the Hindu goddess Sita. The city also hosts the country's largest Buddhist monastery and council of monks. The Roman Catholic Diocese of Chittagong is the oldest catholic mission in Bengal.

Major cultural organizations in the city include the Theatre Institute Chittagong and the Chittagong Performing Arts Academy. The city has a vibrant contemporary art scene.

Being home to the pioneering rock bands in the country like Souls and LRB, Chittagong is regarded as the "birthplace of Bangladeshi rock music".

Demographics

 

At the 2011 Census, Chittagong had a population of more than 2.5 million, and it's Metropolitan Area had a population of 4,009,423. By gender, the population was 54.36% male and 45.64% female, and the literacy rate in the city was approximately 72 percent, in 2020.

Muslims, numbering approximately 3.44 million, form the overwhelming majority of the city's population, with the rest being predominantly Hindus, numbering approximately 480,000, and the remaining 2% belonging to other religions, such as Buddhism and Christianity.Chittagong was a melting pot of ethnicities during the Bengal Sultanate and Mughal Bengal periods. Muslim immigration started as early as the seventh century, and significant Muslim settlements occurred during the medieval period. Muslim traders, rulers, and preachers from Persia and Arabia were the early Muslim settlers, and their descendants are the majority of the current Muslim population of the city. The city has a relatively wealthy and economically influential Shia Muslim community, including Ismailis and Twelver Shias. The city also has many ethnic minorities, especially members of indigenous groups from the frontier hills of Chittagong Division, including Chakmas, Rakhines and Tripuris; as well as Rohingya refugees. The Bengali-speaking Theravada Buddhists of the area, known as Baruas, are one of the oldest communities in Chittagong and one of the last remnants of Buddhism in Bangladesh. Descendants of Portuguese settlers, often known as Firingis, also live in Chittagong, as well as Catholics, who largely live in the old Portuguese enclave of Paterghatta. There is also a small Urdu-speaking Bihari community living in the ethnic enclave known as Bihari Colony.
Like other major urban centers in South Asia, Chittagong has experienced steady growth in its informal settlements as a result of the increasing economic activities in the city and emigration from rural areas. According to a poverty reduction publication of the International Monetary Fund, there were 1,814 slums within the city corporation area, inhabited by about 1.8 million slum dwellers, the second highest in the country after the capital, Dhaka. The slum dwellers often face eviction by the local authorities, charging them with illegal abode on government lands. In the early 1990s, Chittagong had a population of just over 1.5 million, of which there were an estimated 66,676 squatters living in 69 areas.

Media and communications

There are various newspapers, including daily newspapers, opposition newspapers, and business newspapers, based in Chittagong. Daily newspapers include Dainik Azadi, Peoples View, The Daily Suprobhat Bangladesh, Daily Purbokone, Life, Karnafuli, Jyoti, Rashtrobarta and Azan. Furthermore, there are several weekly and monthly newspapers. These include weeklies such as Chattala, Jyoti, Sultan, Chattagram Darpan, and the monthlies such as Sanshodhani, Purobi, Mukulika, and Simanto. The only press council in Chittagong is the Chittagong Press Club. Government-owned Bangladesh Television, with its Chittagong station, and Bangladesh Betar have transmission centers in the city. A local online news & media Channel based on the Chittagonian language was launched in 2016 called CplusTv, gained vast popularity. The channel is YouTube- and social network-based, and it reached the 1 million followers milestone on Facebook.

Chittagong has been featured in all aspects of Bangladeshi popular culture, including television, movies, journals, music and books. Nearly all televisions and radios in Bangladesh have coverage in Chittagong. Renowned Bollywood film director Ashutosh Gowariker directed a movie based on the 1930s Chittagong Uprising, Movie's name is Khelein Hum Jee Jaan Sey in which Abhishek Bachchan played the lead role.

Utilities 
The southern zone of the Bangladesh Power Development Board is responsible for supplying electricity to city dwellers. The fire services are provided by the Bangladesh Fire Service & Civil Defence department, under the Ministry of Home Affairs.
Total Electricity  Consumption  is approximately 1000 megawatts in the city proper.
But in the whole Chittagong  urban  and city proper, it will be 1300 megawatts plus-minus.
Ss power  plant will be in production next year and its production power is 1320 megawatts 
And it creates Chittagong city into the energy production  hub of Bangladesh

The water supply and sewage systems are managed by the Chittagong Water Supply and Sewerage Authority (Chittagong WASA). Water is primarily drawn from Karnaphuli River and then purified in the Mohra Purification Plant.

Chittagong has extensive GSM and CDMA coverage, served by all the major mobile operators of the country, including Grameenphone, Banglalink, Citycell, Robi, TeleTalk and Airtel Bangladesh. However, landline telephone services are provided through the state-owned Bangladesh Telegraph and Telephone Board (BTTB), as well as some private operators. BTTB also provides broadband Internet services, along with some private ISPs, including the 4G service providers Banglalion and Qubee.

Education and research

The education system of Chittagong is similar to that of rest of Bangladesh, with four main forms of schooling. The general education system, conveyed in both Bangla and English versions, follows the curriculum prepared by the National Curriculum and Textbook Board, part of the Ministry of Education. Students are required to take four major board examinations: the Primary School Certificate (PSC), the Junior School Certificate (JSC), the Secondary School Certificate (SSC) and the Higher Secondary School Certificate (HSC) before moving onto higher education. The Board of Intermediate and Secondary Education, Chittagong is responsible for administering SSC and HSC examinations within the city. The Madrasah education system is primarily based on Islamic studies, though other subjects are also taught. Students are prepared according to the Dakhil and Alim examinations, which are controlled by the Bangladesh Madrasah Education Board and are equivalent to SSC and HSC examinations of the general education system respectively. There are also several private schools in the city, usually referred to as English medium schools, which follow the General Certificate of Education.

The British Council supervises the O Levels and A levels examinations, conducted twice a year, through the Cambridge International and Edexcel examination boards. The Technical and Vocational education system is governed by the Directorate of Technical Education (DTE) and follow the curriculum prepared by Bangladesh Technical Education Board (BTEB). Chittagong College, established in 1869, is the earliest modern institution for higher education in the city. Chittagong Veterinary and Animal Sciences University is the only public university located in Chittagong city. Chittagong Medical College is the only government medical college in Chittagong.

The University of Chittagong, which was established in 1966 is one of the largest universities in Bangladesh. Chittagong University of Engineering and Technology, established in 1968, is one of the five public engineering universities in Bangladesh and the only such university in the Chittagong Division.

The city also hosts several other private universities and medical colleges. The BGC Trust University Bangladesh, Chittagong Independent University (CIU), Asian University for Women, Port City International University, East Delta University, International Islamic University, Premier University, Southern University, University of Information Technology and Sciences and the University of Science & Technology Chittagong are among them. Chittagong has public, denominational, and independent schools. Public schools, including pre-schools, primary and secondary schools, and special schools are administered by the Ministry of Education and Chittagong Education Board. Chittagong has governmental and non-governmental primary schools, international schools, and English medium schools. Jamia Ahmadiyya Sunnia Kamil Madrasa is also a famous Islamic University which situated in Chittagong.

Research institutes
Bangladesh Forest Research Institute
Bangladesh Institute of Tropical and Infectious Diseases
Bangladesh Tea Board

Health

The Chittagong Medical College Hospital is the largest state-owned hospital in Chittagong. The Chittagong General Hospital, established in 1901, is the oldest hospital in the city. The Bangladesh Institute of Tropical and Infectious Diseases (BITID) is based the city. Other government-run medical centers in the city include the Family Welfare Centre, TB Hospital, Infectious Disease Hospital, Diabetic Hospital, Mother and Children Hospital, and the Police Hospital. Among the city's private hospitals are the Bangabandhu Memorial Hospital (BBMH), Chittagong Metropolitan Hospital, Chevron Clinic, Surgiscope Hospital, CSCR, Centre Point Hospital, Park View Hospital, Max Hospital & diagnosis, Imperial Hospital LTD., Evercare Hospital Ltd., National Hospital and Mount Hospital Ltd.

Private Medical Colleges:
University of Science & Technology Chittagong
BGC TRUST medical College Chittagong
Chittagong Ma o shishu Hospital
Southern Medical College
Marine City Medical College
Army Medical college
Poly Clinic
CSCR Hospital

Transport

Transport in Chittagong is similar to that of the capital, Dhaka. Large avenues and roads are present throughout the metropolis. There are various bus systems and taxi services, as well as smaller 'baby' or 'CNG' taxis, which are tricycle-structured motor vehicles. Foreign and local ridesharing companies like Uber and Pathao are operating in the city. There are also traditional manual rickshaws, which are very common.

Road

As the population of the city has begun to grow extensively, the Chittagong Development Authority (CDA) has undertaken some transportation initiatives aimed at easing the traffic congestion in Chittagong. Under this plan, the CDA, along with the Chittagong City Corporation, has constructed some flyovers and expanded the existing roads within the city. There are also some other major expressways and flyovers under-construction, most notably the Chittagong City Outer Ring Road, which runs along the coast of Chittagong city. This ring road includes a marine drive along with five feeder roads, and is also meant to strengthen the embankment of the coast. The government has also began the construction of a  underwater expressway tunnel through the Karnaphuli river to ensure better connectivity between the northern and southern parts of Chittagong. This tunnel will be the first of its kind in South Asia.

The N1 (Dhaka-Chittagong Highway), a major arterial national highway, is the only way to access the city by motor vehicle from most other parts of the country. It is considered a very busy and dangerous highway. This highway is also part of AH41 route of the Asian Highway Network. It has been upgraded to 4 lanes. The N106 (Chittagong-Rangamati Highway) is another important national highway that connects the Chittagong Hill Tracts with the city.

Rail
Chittagong can also be accessed by rail. It has a station on the metre gauge, eastern section of the Bangladesh Railway, whose headquarters are also located within the city. There are two main railway stations, on Station Road and in the Pahartali Thana. Trains to Dhaka, Sylhet, Comilla, and Bhairab are available from Chittagong. The Chittagong Circular Railway was introduced in 2013 to ease traffic congestion and to ensure better public transport service for commuters within the city. The railway includes high-speed DEMU trains each with a carrying capacity of 300 passengers. These DEMU trains also travel on the Chittagong-Laksham route which connects the city with Comilla.

Air

The Shah Amanat International Airport , located at South Patenga, serves as Chittagong's only airport. It is the second busiest airport in Bangladesh. The airport is capable of annually handling 1.5 million passengers and 6,000 tonnes of cargo. Known as Chittagong Airfield during World War II, the airport was used as a supply point by the United States Army Air Forces' Tenth Air Force during the Burma Campaign 1944–45. It officially became a Bangladeshi airport in 1972 after Bangladesh's liberation war. International services fly to major cities of the Arabian Peninsula as well as to Indian cities of Kolkata and Chennai. At present, Middle Eastern airlines like Air Arabia, Flydubai, Oman Air and SalamAir operate flights from the city to these destinations along with airlines of Bangladesh. All Bangladeshi airlines operate regular domestic flights to Dhaka. The airport was formerly known as MA Hannan International Airport, but was renamed after a famous Sufi saint Shah Amanat on 2 April 2005 by the Government.
Regional Communication with The Chittagong City:

Oman Air
Air Arabia
Bangladesh Biman
 US Bangla Airlines
Al Zajera airlines
Salam Airlines
Fly Dubai
Novo airlines

Sports

Chittagong has produced numerous cricketers, footballers, and athletes, who have performed at the national level. Tamim Iqbal, Akram Khan, Minhajul Abedin, Aftab Ahmed, Nafees Iqbal, Nazimuddin, Faisal Hossain, Tareq Aziz, Mominul Haque, Irfan Sukkur, Yasir Ali Chowdhury, Nayeem Hasan, Minhajul Abedin Afridi are some of the most prominent figures among them. Cricket is the most popular sport in Chittagong, while football, tennis and kabaddi are also popular. A number of stadiums are located in Chittagong with the main one being the multipurpose MA Aziz Stadium, which has a seating capacity of 20,000 and hosts football matches in addition to cricket. MA Aziz Stadium was the stadium where Bangladesh achieved its first-ever Test cricket victory, against Zimbabwe in 2005. The stadium now focuses only on football, and is currently the main football venue of the city. Zohur Ahmed Chowdhury Stadium, is currently the main cricket venue of the city, which was awarded Test status in 2006, hosting both domestic and international cricket matches. The city hosted two group matches of the 2011 ICC Cricket World Cup, both taking place in Zohur Ahmed Chowdhury Stadium. It also co-hosted 2014 ICC World Twenty20 along with Dhaka and Sylhet, Zohur Ahmed Chowdhury Stadium hosted 15 group stage matches. Other stadiums in Chittagong include the Women's Complex Ground. Major sporting clubs such as, Mohammedan Sporting Club and Abahani Chittagong are also located in the city. Chittagong is also home to the Bangladesh Premier League franchise, the Chittagong Vikings.

Teams
Chattogram Challengers - BPL (Cricket)
Chittagong Abahani Limited - BPL  (Football)
Acme Chattogram - HCT (Field hockey)

Twin towns – sister cities
 Goiânia, Brazil
 Kunming, China

See also
 Jamboree Park

 Conquest of Chittagong

Notes

Explanatory notes

Citations

External links

 Official Web Portal of Chittagong
 Chittagong City Corporation
 Chittagong Development Authority
 Chittagong Metropolitan Police
 

 
Bay of Bengal
Chittagong District
Former colonies in Asia
Former Portuguese colonies
Populated coastal places in Bangladesh
Populated places in Chittagong Division
Port cities in Asia
Portuguese colonisation in Asia